Roux Island is an island  long, lying  north of Arrowsmith Peninsula at the west side of the entrance to Lallemand Fjord, off the west coast of Graham Land. Discovered by the French Antarctic Expedition under Charcot, 1908–10, who named it for Jules Charles-Roux.

See also 
 List of Antarctic and sub-Antarctic islands
 

Islands of Graham Land
Loubet Coast